The Brendel–Bormann oscillator model is a mathematical formula for the frequency dependence of the complex-valued relative permittivity, sometimes referred to as the dielectric function. The model has been used to fit to the complex refractive index of materials with absorption lineshapes exhibiting non-Lorentzian broadening, such as metals and amorphous insulators, across broad spectral ranges, typically near-ultraviolet, visible, and infrared frequencies. The dispersion relation bears the names of R. Brendel and D. Bormann, who derived the model in 1992, despite first being applied to optical constants in the literature by Andrei M. Efimov and E. G. Makarova in 1983. Around that time, several other researchers also independently discovered the model. The Brendel-Bormann oscillator model is aphysical because it does not satisfy the Kramers–Kronig relations. The model is non-causal, due to a singularity at zero frequency, and non-Hermitian. These drawbacks inspired J. Orosco and C. F. M. Coimbra to develop a similar, causal oscillator model.

Mathematical formulation 
The general form of an oscillator model is given by

where
  is the relative permittivity,
  is the value of the relative permittivity at infinite frequency,
  is the angular frequency,
  is the contribution from the th absorption mechanism oscillator.

The Brendel-Bormann oscillator is related to the Lorentzian oscillator  and Gaussian oscillator , given by

where
  is the Lorentzian strength of the th oscillator,
  is the Lorentzian resonant frequency of the th oscillator,
  is the Lorentzian broadening of the th oscillator,
  is the Gaussian broadening of the th oscillator.

The Brendel-Bormann oscillator  is obtained from the convolution of the two aforementioned oscillators in the manner of
,

which yields

where
  is the Faddeeva function,
 .

The square root in the definition of  must be taken such that its imaginary component is positive. This is achieved by:

References

See also 
 Cauchy equation
 Sellmeier equation
 Forouhi–Bloomer model
 Tauc–Lorentz model
 Lorentz oscillator model

Condensed matter physics
Electric and magnetic fields in matter
Optics